Getlink, formerly Groupe Eurotunnel, is a European public company based in Paris that manages and operates the infrastructure of the Channel Tunnel between England and France, operates the Eurotunnel Shuttle train service, and earns revenue on other trains that operate through the tunnel (Eurostar passenger and DB Schenker freight).

Groupe Eurotunnel was established on 13 August 1986 to finance, build, and operate the Channel Tunnel under a concession granted by the French and British governments. The tunnel was constructed between 1988 and 1994 by TransManche Link (TML) under a contract issued by Groupe Eurotunnel; construction costs would overrun considerably, from TML's original estimate of £4.7 billion to the final cost of £9.5 billion. On 6 May 1994, the completed tunnel was officially opened. Its rail infrastructure comprises  of double track railway in the main tunnels, plus extensive surface-level terminal facilities at Folkestone in England and Calais in France. The rail network for operation of the Eurotunnel Shuttle train services is entirely self-contained, with connections near the two terminals to the respective national railway networks. Signalling and electric traction supply are also under Getlink control.

In 1995, a loss of £925 million was reported by Groupe Eurotunnel; this was partly due to many of the planned services to use the tunnel not yet being permitted. On 2 August 2006, following failed debt restructuring plans, Groupe Eurotunnel was placed into bankruptcy protection; a restructuring plan that involved a £2.8 billion funding arrangement and a debt-for-equity swap was approved by shareholders in May 2007. That same year, it reported a net profit of €1 million, the company's first profitable year. In December 2009, Groupe Eurotunnel and SNCF acquired the French rail freight operator Veolia Cargo, gaining multiple subsidiaries in the process. In June 2010, the company acquired British rail freight company First GBRf for £31 million from FirstGroup. In 2012, Groupe Eurotunnel acquired three Channel ferries formerly belonging to the liquidated SeaFrance ferry service, establishing MyFerryLink to operate them, although this was discontinued due to monopoly allegations after a brief period. On 20 November 2017, Groupe Eurotunnel changed its name to Getlink. In March 2018, the Italian holding company Atlantia acquired the 15.49% stake of Goldman Sachs in Getlink, for roughly €1 billion.

History

Foundation and early activity
Getlink's origins can be traced to the formation of Groupe Eurotunnel on 13 August 1986; it was established in accordance with the Concession Agreement of 1986 between the governments of France and the United Kingdom with the goal of financing, building and operation of a tunnel between England and France. Groupe Eurotunnel awarded a contract for the tunnel's construction to the  bi-national project organisation TransManche Link (TML). Furthermore, the company employed Maître d'Oeuvre to act as a supervisory engineering body under the terms of the concession that monitored and reported on the project.

While TML designed and built the tunnel, financing was handled by Groupe Eurotunnel; however, the British and French governments controlled final engineering and safety decisions, later formalised through the Channel Tunnel Safety Authority. The British and French governments gave Eurotunnel a 55-year operating concession, originally running from 1987; this was extended by 10 years to 65 years in 1993. Private funding for such a complex infrastructure project was of unprecedented scale. An initial equity of £45 million was raised, then increased by £206 million private institutional placement, £770 million was raised in a public share offer that included press and television advertisements, a syndicated bank loan and letter of credit arranged £5 billion. The final cost for the tunnel's construction came to around £9.5 billion, roughly double TML's original estimate of £4.7 billion. This overrun has been attributed, in part, as a response to enhanced safety, security, and environmental demands. Financing costs were 140% higher than forecast.

Construction of the tunnel took place between 1988 and 1994; at the peak of construction activity, roughly 15,000 people were employed while in excess of £3 million was being expended each day. On 6 May 1994, the completed tunnel was officially opened by Queen Elizabeth II and President François Mitterrand, regular services commenced later that same month. In its first year of operation, Groupe Eurotunnel lost £925 million, which was attributed to disappointing revenue from both passengers and freight traffic, as well as heavy interest charges on its £8 billion of debt. The poor fiscal performance can also be partially attributed to the phased opening of the tunnel; various services awaited approval from the Channel Tunnel Safety Authority, some of which did not receive permission to commence until over a year after the tunnel's official opening date.

On 10 July 1997, a financial restructuring plan was approved by Groupe Eurotunnel's shareholders. On 19 December, both the British and French governments officially agreed to extend its concession to 2086. On 7 April 1998, the financial restructuring process was officially completed. On 30 December 1999, as required by the Concession Agreement, Groupe Eurotunnel presented a road tunnel project to the British and French governments.

2000s
On 13 February 2004, Groupe Eurotunnel was granted a rail operator's licence in France, becoming the first company ever to possess such status.

In April 2004, a dissident shareholder group led by Nicolas Miguet succeeded in taking control of Groupe Eurotunnel's board. However, during February 2005, Jean-Louis Raymond, the Chief Executive appointed as a consequence of the boardroom coup, resigned and Jacques Gounon took complete control, becoming both Chairman and Chief Executive. During July 2006, shareholders voted on a deal that would have seen half the debt, by then reduced to £6.2 billion, exchanged for 87% of the equity. However, this plan failed, and on 2 August 2006, Groupe Eurotunnel was placed into bankruptcy protection by a French court for six months. In May 2007, a restructuring plan was approved by shareholders, whereby Deutsche Bank, Goldman Sachs, and Citigroup agreed to provide £2.8 billion of long-term funding and the balance of the debt being exchanged for equity, and the shareholders agreed to waive numerous perks, such as unlimited free travel, that they had previously been entitled to.

During June 2007, the company entered into a partnership through subsidiary Europorte 2 with the Port of Dunkirk relating to rail freight traffic. Under this partnership, Groupe Eurotunnel was to operate trains from Dunkirk to the Delta 3 logistics terminal at Dourges, and collaborate on container shipments to the United Kingdom, using the port of Dunkirk via the tunnel.

Following the restructuring, Groupe Eurotunnel was able to announce a small net profit of €1 million in 2007, reportedly for the first time in the company's existence. Half-year earnings for 2008 rose to €26 million (£20.6 million), while net profit was €40 million, despite the costs associated with traffic loss from September 2008 to February 2009 following a fire in the tunnel; this allowed Eurotunnel to issue its first-ever dividend of €0.04 per euro value.

The return to financial health allowed Groupe Eurotunnel to announce, on 28 October 2009, the anticipated voluntary redemption of some of its convertible debt. By anticipating to November 2009 the reimbursement of debt due in July 2010, it aimed to issue up to 119.4 million new ordinary shares, and thus shore up its capital while reducing its debt load.

In December 2009, Groupe Eurotunnel and the French state railway operator SNCF acquired the French rail freight operator Veolia Cargo, splitting the business between them. The company took over French operations: Veolia Cargo France, Veolia Cargo Link, and CFTA Cargo are expected to be rebranded Europorte France, Europorte Link and Europorte proximity and become part of its Europorte freight business. Socorail has not been announced as being rebranded.

2010s
In January 2010, the Port of Dunkirk awarded Eurotunnel a seven-year concession to operate its  railway system.

In June 2010, the company acquired British railfreight company First GBRf for £31 million from FirstGroup, to be merged into its Europorte subsidiary. It was rebranded GB Railfreight.

On 11 June 2012, a bid by Groupe Eurotunnel for three Channel ferries belonging to former operator SeaFrance (in liquidation) for lease to another operator was accepted, and Eurotunnel acquired the SeaFrance ferries Berlioz, Rodin and Nord Pas-de-Calais. Eurotunnel was chartered to start the MyFerryLink ferry company on 20 August 2012. After years of legal fights over accusations that Eurotunnel operating a ferry line was uncompetitive, the company stopped operating MyFerryLink on 1 July 2015.

Groupe Eurotunnel transferred its listing from the London Stock Exchange to Euronext London on 19 July 2012.

For the year 2015, statistics estimated that over 10.5 million passengers travelled on the Eurotunnel with 2,556,585 cars, 58,387 coaches and 1,483,741 goods vehicles.

On 20 November 2017, Groupe Eurotunnel changed its name to Getlink.

In March 2018, the Italian holding company Atlantia acquired the 15.49% stake of Goldman Sachs in Getlink and its 26.66% voting rights, for around €1 billion.

In June 2018, Getlink and auditor EY jointly presented a recent study on UK–Europe trade flows via the Channel Tunnel to the European Commission. Findings of this study included that, in 2016, the Channel Tunnel facilitated €138Bn of trade, believed to be roughly 26% of the total trade flows between Britain and continental Europe with an equal balance of imports and exports.

In May 2019, Getlink celebrated 25 years of operation of the Channel Tunnel with the creation of a monumental fresco by street-art artist YZ on the Tunnel's French-side entrance.

2020s
In early 2020, Getlink announced the separation of the position of chairman of the supervisory board from that of chief executive officer from July 2020; accordingly, Jacques Gounon remained President and Yann Leriche became CEO. In June 2020, the company dropped its listing on the London stock exchange; it remains listed on the Euronext Paris market.

Following the Brexit vote for the United Kingdom to leave the European Union, Getlink and subsidiary company Eurotunnel made preparations for impending border control changes. Accordingly, an additional two hundred ninety new truck parking spaces at the Coquelles terminal were provided, while all the truck controls have been grouped into a single point, the Pit-Stop, and three additional control lanes at the Coquelles terminal and two lanes at the Folkestone were created. A smart border has been developed in collaboration with Customs and a Customs-SIVEP center to carry out additional veterinary and phytosanitary controls has been built.

SAS PARAFE, for the identity check of coach passengers, were installed on the two terminals in 2019; furthermore, 300 French and English staff were trained in administrative and customs formalities, veterinary and phytosanitary procedures, checks and document scanning, support and information for customers. More than 500 institutional visits took place at the Coquelles and Folkestone sites in 2019.

Operations and services

Vehicle shuttle trains

The company operates shuttle services with Eurotunnel Class 9 locomotives.

Getlink operates two types of shuttle trains that transport vehicles through the Channel Tunnel along with two terminals to support the operation of the trains. Le Shuttle trains transport personal vehicles and coaches, while Le Shuttle Freight transports large trucks.

Freight train services

Europorte operates freight trains in France, as well as the cross channel freight services performed by Europorte 2 before 2009. Since the part acquisition of Veolia Cargo in September 2009, it also provides rail transport services to industrial locations through Socorail.

Passenger services

Getlink hosts, but does not operate, passenger train services through the Channel Tunnel. , Eurostar is the only passenger train operator that uses the tunnel, offering services that connects the United Kingdom with France, Belgium & The Netherlands.

Eurostar trains are operated by Eurostar International Limited, whose majority owner is SNCF, the national railway of France. Eurostar International is the largest customer of Getlink, which levies charges (currently £25 per passenger per return journey) for use of the tunnel.

Samphire Hoe

The company also owns the small nature reserve of Samphire Hoe on the coast of Kent, England, which was created from Channel Tunnel spoil during construction in the 1980s/90s. The road tunnel down, the ventilation area and the reserve itself are all owned by Eurotunnel.

Future operations

Low cost passenger train service 
In August 2018, Bloomberg Businessweek reported that Getlink is interested in setting up an Ouigo-style low cost high speed rail service between London and Paris, travelling between the railway stations of Stratford International and Charles-de-Gaulle. In March 2022, Getlink was reportedly examining the prospects of establishing its own rolling stock leasing company in order to lower the costs involved in operating trains through the Channel Tunnel and launching such services.

Regional rail 
In September 2020, Getlink announces a partnership with RATP Dev to jointly bid under the "Régionéo" brand name for regional rail services in France which will gradually opened to competitive tendering.

Rolling stock

See also
 High-speed rail in Europe
 Irish Sea Tunnel

References

Citations

Bibliography

Further reading

External links

 

Companies based in Paris
Companies formerly listed on the London Stock Exchange
Companies listed on Euronext Paris
Channel Tunnel
Railway companies established in 1986
Railway companies of France
Railway companies of the United Kingdom
1986 establishments in France
Railway infrastructure managers